Kolåstinden is a mountain in the municipality of Ørsta, Møre og Romsdal county, Norway.

The summit is most easily reached from the area around the Standalhytta chalet, operated by the Aalesunds Skiklub, southwest of Store Standal. It is easiest to reach the peak in the winter and spring on skis, while it is recommended that those accessing in the summer bring ropes for glacier crossings.

See also
List of mountains of Norway

References

Mountains of Møre og Romsdal
Ørsta